Browns is a fashion boutique based in London, England. It was founded by Joan Burstein and husband Sidney in 1970. The flagship store was on London's South Molton Street but after 50 years moved to Brook Street in May 2021. In 2015, Browns was acquired by Portuguese online fashion company Farfetch.

History
Joan Burstein founded Browns with her late husband, Sidney, in 1970. Initially a small boutique housed on the ground floor at 27 South Molton Street, Browns grew rapidly expanding through five connecting Georgian townhouses. Their daughter Caroline Burstein founded Molton Brown before joining Browns as creative director in 1993. Their son Simon Burstein became CEO.

Known for discovering talents such as John Galliano, Alexander McQueen, Hussein Chalayan, and Christopher Kane, it also brought designers such as Calvin Klein, Sabine G., Armani, Ralph Lauren and Jil Sander to London. Browns has continued to support both young and established fashion designers.

In 2006, Joan Burstein (known in the fashion industry as Mrs B) received a CBE in the Queen’s Birthday Honours List for services to fashion. Sidney Burnstein died in April 2010.

In May 2015, Browns passed from family ownership when it was acquired by the fashion website Farfetch. Joan Burnstein stayed on as honorary chair and her son and daughter Simon and Caroline retained seats on the board.

Stores
Browns includes Brownsfashion.com, Browns at 23-27 South Molton Street with Browns Focus at number 24, Browns at 160 Sloane Street and bridalwear stores Browns Bride, 12 Hinde Street and Vera Wang at Browns, 59 Brook Street.
In October 2017, Browns East opened in East London

References

External links
 Official website

Shops in London
Buildings and structures in the City of Westminster
Retail companies established in 1970
1970 establishments in England